Avdancık can refer to:

 Avdancık, Bucak
 Avdancık, Osmangazi